Goodrich High School is a 1A public high school located in Goodrich, Texas. It is a part of the Goodrich Independent School District that serves students in south central Polk County, Texas. In 2011, the school was rated "Academically Unacceptable" by the Texas Education Agency.

Athletics
The Goodrich Hornets compete in these sports -

Basketball
Cross Country
Tennis
Track and Field
Volleyball

State titles
Boys Basketball - 
2001(1A/D2)

State finalists
Boys Basketball -
1998(1A), 2002(1A/D2), 2008(1A/D1)

References

External links
 Goodrich ISD

Schools in Polk County, Texas
Public high schools in Texas